Luigi Ademollo (April 30, 1764 – February 11, 1849) was an Italian painter.

Biography
He was born in Milan. He studied at the Brera Academy, where he was taught by Giulio Traballesi, Giocondo Albertolli, and Giuseppe Piermarini. He left Milan in 1783 and traveled and worked in Rome and Florence. He married Margaret Cimballi Ferrara in Rome in 1792 and had several children. Ademollo primarily painted frescoes with biblical scenes from the Old and New Testaments. In 1789 he was appointed professor at the Academy of Fine Arts in Florence. He painted in theaters, including the decoration of sipari (theater curtains). He helped fresco the Royal Chapel in the Pitti Palace and also the churches of Santissima Annunziata and Sant'Ambrogio. In Siena, he painted frescoes for the Palazzo Venturi Gallerani and Palazzo Segardi. He died in Florence in 1849.

His son Agostino Ademollo (1799–1841) was a writer of romances, including Marietta di' Ricci. His grandson Carlo Ademollo was a history and battle scene painter.

References

 G. Mellini, Opening for Louis Ademollo, in "Art Illustrated", 57, 1974
 Bolaffi Encyclopedic Dictionary of painters and engravers Italian eleventh to the twentieth century, vol. I, Turin 1972
 P. Bucarelli, voice Ademollo, Louis, in the Biographical Dictionary of Italian, 1, Rome 1960
 E. Lavagnino, Modern art from the neo-classical to contemporary, I, Turin 1956

18th-century Italian painters
Italian male painters
19th-century Italian painters
Painters from Milan
Painters from Florence
Brera Academy alumni
Academic staff of the Accademia di Belle Arti di Firenze
1764 births
1849 deaths
19th-century Italian male artists
18th-century Italian male artists